The St. Francis Xavier X-Men and X-Women are the men's and women's athletic teams that represent St. Francis Xavier University in Antigonish, Nova Scotia, Canada. Their primary home turf is Oland Stadium located at the University's campus.

History
In 1966, the X-Men Football team won the College Bowl (now the Vanier Cup) as top university football team in Canada. The X-Men Basketball program has won 3 CIS Championships (1993, 2000, and 2001) and in 2004, the X-Men Hockey team won their first CIS Championship. In 2011, the X-Women Hockey team placed 2nd at the CIS Championships in Ottawa and in 2016, the X-Men hockey team were runners-up in the CIS Championships in Halifax.

In 2006, the X-Women Rugby team became the first female StFX varsity team to win a CIS Championship, as 10-time defending AUS Rugby Champions. In 2008, the team placed 2nd at the CIS Championships in Lethbridge, Alberta after capturing their 12th consecutive AUS Championship. The team has a total of five National Championships, having won a fifth title in 2016 in Victoria, BC. and 17 consecutive conference championships from 1997-2014.

Between 2006 and 2016 the X-Men Cross Country team won 9 AUS Championships, including 6 consecutively and 2 CIS medals. In 2017 it was announced that alumnus, CIS Champion, and Olympian Eric Gillis would become head coach.

Varsity teams
The X-Men & X-Women compete in:
 Basketball (m/w)
 Cross Country Running (m/w)
 Football (m)
 Ice Hockey (m/w)
 Rugby (w)
 Soccer (m/w)
 Track & Field (m/w)

X-Men football

The X-Men football program has been in operation since 1954. They were the first Atlantic conference team to win a Vanier Cup national championship in 1966 and have also finished as runner-ups in the 1996 game. The team has won 13 Jewett Trophy conference championships.

X-Women ice hockey

The X-Women ice hockey team has participated in the Atlantic University Sport conference since the sport was established in the CIAU in 1997. The program has won 11 AUS conference championships with the most recent coming in 2020. Nationally, the program's best finish was in 2011 when they finished as national runners-up.

References

External links
 

St. Francis Xavier University
U Sports teams
Antigonish, Nova Scotia
St. Francis Xavier X-Men